Stony Creek is a  long 4th order tributary to the Haw River, in Alamance and Caswell Counties, North Carolina.

Course
Stony Creek rises at Cherry Grove, North Carolina in Caswell County on the divide between Stony Creek and Country Line Creek of the Dan River.  The creek then flows south into Alamance County and through two impoundments, Lake Burlington and Stony Creek Reservoir, to meet the Haw River at Hopedale, North Carolina.

Watershed
Stony Creek drains  of area, receives about 46.2 in/year of precipitation, and has a wetness index of 423.81 and is about 45% forested.

See also
List of rivers of North Carolina

References

Rivers of North Carolina
Rivers of Alamance County, North Carolina
Rivers of Caswell County, North Carolina